Statistics of the Primera Fuerza amateur football league in Mexico for the season 1915/1916.

Overview
It was contested by 6 teams, and Club España won the championship.

League standings

Top goalscorers
Players sorted first by goals scored, then by last name.

References
Mexico - List of final tables (RSSSF)

1915-16
Mex
1915–16 in Mexican football